Zhanna Ivanivna Usenko-Chorna (born May 1, 1973 in Kyiv) is a Ukrainian lawyer, Merited Jurist of Ukraine and former member and Deputy chairwoman of the Central Election Commission of Ukraine.

Biography
Born May 1, 1973 in Kyiv. In 1997 graduated from Kyiv University with a degree in history and again in 2000 with a degree in international law.

In 1999 Usenko-Chorna was appointed principal consultant of the National Bureau for compliance with the European Convention on Human Rights of the Ministry of Justice of Ukraine. Since May 2000 she was appointed Senior Consultant of the Verkhovna Rada (Ukrainian parliament) on legal policy and adviser for the Presidential Administration of Ukraine and deputy head of the administration.

Since December 2004 a member of the Central Election Commission and from June 2007 Deputy Chairman of the Central Election Commission.

The Ukrainian parliament dismissed her and 12 other members of the Central Election Commission on 20 September 2018.

References

External links
Profile on Central Election Commission of Ukraine website 

21st-century Ukrainian lawyers
Living people
1973 births
Lawyers from Kyiv
21st-century Ukrainian women politicians
Taras Shevchenko National University of Kyiv alumni
Central Election Commission (Ukraine)
Ukrainian women lawyers
21st-century women lawyers
Recipients of the Honorary Diploma of the Cabinet of Ministers of Ukraine